Tsukamurella sinensis is a bacterium from the genus of Tsukamurella which has been isolated from a patient from the Queen Mary Hospital in Hong Kong.

References

External links
Type strain of Tsukamurella sinensis at BacDive -  the Bacterial Diversity Metadatabase	

Mycobacteriales
Bacteria described in 2016